
Year 427 (CDXXVII) was a common year starting on Saturday (link will display the full calendar) of the Julian calendar. At the time, it was known as the Year of the Consulship of Hierus and Ardabur (or, less frequently, year 1180 Ab urbe condita). The denomination 427 for this year has been used since the early medieval period, when the Anno Domini calendar era became the prevalent method in Europe for naming years.

Events 
 By place 

 Roman Empire 
 Flavius Aetius, Roman general (magister militum), arrives in southern Gaul with an army (40,000 men) and defeats the Visigoths under King Theodoric I, who are besieging the strategic city of Arles.   
 Bonifacius, Roman governor (Last of the Romans), revolts in Africa against Emperor Valentinian III. Under the influence of Aetius, he is convicted of treason by empress-mother Galla Placidia.

 Europe 
 The Roman province of Pannonia Prima is finally assimilated into the Hunnic Empire.

 Asia 
 The Ephthalites (White Huns) invade Western Asia and reduce the Sasanian Empire threat to the Eastern Roman Empire. King Bahram V sends an expeditionary force into Khorasan. 
 King Jangsu transfers the Goguryeo capital from Gungnae City (modern Ji'an, Jilin) on the banks of the Yalu River to Pyongyang (modern Korea).
 Biyu becomes king of the Korean kingdom of Baekje.

Births 
 Erbin of Dumnonia, Brythonic king (approximate date)
 Qi Gaodi, Chinese emperor of the Southern Qi Dynasty (d. 482)
 Wang Xianyuan, empress and wife of Song Xiaowudi (d. 464)

Deaths 
 December 24 – Sisinnius I, archbishop of Constantinople
 Guisin, king of Baekje (Korea)
 Tao Qian, Chinese poet of the Eastern Jin Dynasty (b. 365)

References